"Let a Woman Be a Woman" is a 1969 song by Dyke and the Blazers. The song was written by bandleader Arlester Christian.

Chart performance

Sampling 
According to the sampling website database WhoSampled.com, "Let a Woman Be a Woman" is on the Sampled in More Than 100 Songs list and was on the Most Sampled Tracks list at #100 with more than 180 songs sampling, until being knocked off by the Fairlight CMI digital synthesizer sampled for the "ORCH5" orchestra hit sample, itself sampling the Philharmonia Orchestra's Firebird Suite by Igor Stravinsky. Nonetheless, it is one of the most sampled singles primarily due to the breakbeat after the line "Some people don't like the way Sally walk" which lined up to the sound effect of a firetruck, giving it its unique sound. The songs sampling include "If My Homie Calls" by 2Pac (1991), "Rusty" by Tyler, the Creator ft. Earl Sweatshirt and Domo Genesis (2013), "Sally" by Stetsasonic (1988), where the entire song centers around the "Sally" line and sample, "Welcome to the Terrordome" by Public Enemy (1989), and even outside of hip-hop with "Jack-Ass" by Beck (1996) and "How You Like Me Now?" by The Heavy (2009).

References

1969 songs
1969 singles
Funk songs
American rhythm and blues songs
American pop songs